Wanghailou Subdistrict is a subdistrict located on the western side of Hebei District, Tianjin, China. It shares border with Hongshunli Subdistrict in its northwest, Ningyuan Subdistrict in its northeast, Guangfu Avenue Subdistrict in its southeast, and Dahutong Subdistrict in its southwest. In the year 2010, its population was 86,401.

The subdistrict was named after Wanghailou Catherla that is located on the southwest of the subdistrict.

Geography 
Wanghailou subdistrict is on the eastern bank of Hai River.

History

Administrative divisions 
In 2021, Wanghailou Subdistrict consisted of 11 residential communities, which are listed as follows:

Gallery

References 

Township-level divisions of Tianjin
Hebei District, Tianjin